The Itatiaia spinetail (Asthenes moreirae), also known as the Itatiaia thistletail, is a species of bird in the family Furnariidae. It was previously placed as the only member of the genus Oreophylax; however, recent classification has placed it in the genus Asthenes. It is endemic to southeastern Brazil. Its common name refers to the Itatiaia region. Its natural habitat is subtropical or tropical high-altitude shrubland.

References

Itatiaia spinetail
Birds of Brazil
Endemic birds of Brazil
Itatiaia spinetail
Itatiaia spinetail
Taxonomy articles created by Polbot